Sonpur railway division  is one of the five railway divisions under East Central Railway zone of Indian Railways.

History 
Sonpur division was established on 21 Oct. 1978 in North Eastern Railway zone. The ECR zone came into existence on 8 September 1996. Garhara yard and  Dinkar Gram Simaria station were merged into this division on 1 January 2005. 
The Divisional Railway Manager (DRM) is Nilmani and the Additional Divisional Railway Manager (ADRM) is Pankaj Kumar Sinha.

Geography 
It follows the north side of the Ganges and the west side of the Gandak River.

The division routes over 495.361 km, all on BG. This division traverses through 8 districts of Bihar: Saran, Vaishali, Muzaffarpur, Samastipur, Begusarai, Khagaria, Bhagalpur  and  Katihar. Its headquarter is located at Hajipur, Bihar in the state of Bihar of India.

Danapur railway division,  Mughalsarai railway division,  Dhanbad railway division, and Samastipur railway division are the other  railway divisions under ECR Zone headquartered at  Hajipur.

Sonpur railway division area starts from Goldinganj (GJH) in the west in Saran.

Stations 
The list includes the stations  under the Sonpur railway division and their station category.

Stations closed for Passengers -

References

 
Divisions of Indian Railways
1951 establishments in Bihar